MA-9 may refer to:

 
 Massachusetts Route 9
 Mercury-Atlas 9, a spaceflight of Project Mercury